Literaturpreis Prenzlauer Berg is a literary prize of Germany for young writers.

Recipients

 2001 Jan Brandt, Monika Rinck, Daniel Falb
 2002 Larissa Boehning, Niklas Ritter
 2003 Svenja Leiber, Louisa Söllner, Susan Kreller
 2004 Jana Scheerer, Martina Wildner, Friederike von Koenigswald
 2005 Daniel Gräfe, Sascha Reh, Kolja Mensing
 2006 Myriam Keil, Diana Feuerbach, Carsten Schneider
 2007 Caroline Schleier, Alexandra Steffes, Steffen Roye
 2008 Christian de Simoni, Katharina Bendixen, Anders Kamp, Benjamin Lauterbach
 2009 Thomas Mahler, Daniel Kindslehner, Christina Kettering, Isabel Cole
 2010 Jens Deeg, Jasamin Ulfat, Pierre Horn
 2011 Jenifer Joanna Becker, Stefanie de Velasco
 2012 Christoph Schreiber, Anna-Maria Brehm, Jan Decker
 2013 Diana Heinrich, André Hager
 2014 Ursula Kirchenmayer, Lili Wang, Maximilian Deibert
 2015 Valentin Moritz, Saskia Trebing, Christian Dittloff
 2016 Jan Weidner, Angela Lehner, Nadine Schneider
 2017 David Blum, Judith Lehmann, Alexander Raschle

External links 
 Official Website

German literary awards